This article lists Georgian monarchs, and includes monarchs of various Georgian kingdoms, principalities and duchies.

Georgian monarchs:

List of monarchs of Georgia
List of Georgian royal consorts 
List of mothers to monarchs of Georgia 
List of Georgian princes (mtavars)
List of Georgian dukes (eristavs) 
List of monarchs of Kakheti and Hereti
Style of the Georgian sovereign

Family trees of Georgian monarchs 
Georgian monarchs family tree of Iberia
Georgian monarchs family tree of Bagrationi dynasty of Tao-Klarjeti
Georgian monarchs family tree of Bagrationi dynasty of united Georgia
Georgian monarchs family tree of Bagrationi dynasty of Kartli
Georgian monarchs family tree of Bagrationi dynasty of Kakheti
Georgian monarchs family tree of Bagrationi dynasty of Imereti